Jeffery W. Kelly (born August 23, 1960 in Medina, New York) is an American chemist and entrepreneur who is on the faculty of the Scripps Research Institute in La Jolla, California.

Biography
Kelly received his Ph.D. in organic chemistry from the University of North Carolina at Chapel Hill (1986) and performed post-doctoral research at The Rockefeller University (1986–89).

He is former Dean of Graduate Studies (2000-2008) and Vice President of Academic Affairs (2000-2006) and co-Chairman of Molecular Medicine and the Lita Annenberg Hazen Professor of Chemistry within the Skaggs Institute of Chemical Biology at The Scripps Research Institute in La Jolla, California.  His research focuses on understanding protein folding, misfolding and aggregation and on developing both chemical and biological strategies to ameliorate diseases caused by protein misfolding and/or aggregation.

Kelly has cofounded three biotechnology companies, FoldRx Pharmaceuticals with Susan Lindquist in 2003, Proteostasis Therapeutics, Inc. with Andrew Dillin and Richard Morimoto in 2010, and Misfolding Diagnostics in 2012.

His lab began looking for ways to inhibit transthyretin fibril formation in the 1990s.  Tafamidis was eventually discovered by Kelly's team using a structure-based drug design strategy; the structure was first published in 2003.  In 2003 Kelly co-founded FoldRx with Susan Lindquist of MIT and the Whitehead Institute and FoldRx developed tafamidis up through submitting an application for marketing approval in Europe in early 2010. FoldRx was acquired by Pfizer later that year.

Honors and Awards
1991 - Searle Scholar Award

1999 - Biophysical Society National Lecturer (Award)

1999 - Protein Society-Dupont Young Investigator Award

2000 - SUNY at Fredonia Alumni Distinguished Achievement Award

2001 - American Chemical Society Arthur C. Cope Scholar Award

2006 - National Institutes of Health Merit Award

2008 - American Peptide Society Vincent du Vigneaud Award

2011 - American Peptide Society Rao Makineni Lectureship (Award)

2011 - Protein Society Emil T. Kaiser Award

2012 - American Chemical Society, Ralph F. Hirschmann Award in Peptide Chemistry

2012 - the Biopolymers Murray Goodman Memorial Prize

2016 - Royal Society of Chemistry Jeremy Knowles Award

2016 - Jacob Heskel Gabbay Award in Biotechnology and Medicine

2016 - Commencement address at SUNY Fredonia.

2016 - Member of the American Academy of Arts and Sciences 

2017 - Chemical Pioneer Award of the American Institute of Chemists

2017 - Fellow of the Royal Society of Chemistry

2017 - Fellow of the National Academy of Inventors

2023 - Wolf Prize in Chemistry.

Significant Papers

1992	  Colon, W.; Kelly, J.W. "Partial Denaturation of Transthyretin is Sufficient for Amyloid Fibril Formation In Vitro." Biochemistry, 31 8654-8660.

2001  Jager, M.; Nguyen, H.; Crane, J.C.; Kelly, J.W.; Gruebele, M. "The Folding Mechanism of a β-Sheet: The WW Domain" J. Mol. Biol., 311, 373-393.

2001 Hammarstrom, P.; Schneider, F.; Kelly, J.W. "Trans-Suppression of Misfolding In An Amyloid Disease" Science 293, 2459-2461.

2002	 Sawkar, A.R.; Cheng, W-C.; Beutler, E.: Wong, C.–H.: Balch, W.E.: Kelly, J.W. "Chemical Chaperones Increase the Cellular Activity of N370S β-glucosidase: A Therapeutic Strategy for Gaucher Disease "  Proc. Natl. Acad. Sci. 99, 15428-15433.

2003	 Hammarstrom, P.; Wiseman, R. L.; Powers, E.T.; Kelly, J.W. "Prevention of Transthyretin Amyloid Disease by Changing Protein Misfolding Energetics" Science 299, 713-716.

2004 Deechongkit, S.; Nguyen, H.; Dawson, P.E.; Gruebele, M.; Kelly, J.W. “Context Dependent Contributions of Backbone H-Bonding to β-Sheet Folding Energetics” Nature  430, 101-105.

2005	 Sekijima, Y., Wiseman, R.L., Matteson, J., Hammarström, P., Miller,S.R., Balch, W.E., Kelly, J.W. “Biological and Chemical Basis for Tissue Selective Amyloid Disease”Cell 121, 73-85.

2006	 Fowler, D.M.; Koulov, A.V.; Alory-Jost, C.; Marks, M.S.; Balch, W.E; Kelly, J.W. "Functional Amyloid Formation Within Mammalian Tissue " PLoS Biology 4, 100-107.

2008	 Mu, T-W.; Ong, D.S.T.; Wang, Y-J; Balch, W. E.; Yates, J.R.; Segatori, L.; Kelly, J.W. .”Chemical and Biological Approaches Synergize to Ameliorate Protein-Folding Diseases” Cell 134, 769-781.

2008	 Balch, W.E.; Morimoto, R.I.; Dillin, A.; Kelly, J.W. “Adapting Proteostasis For Disease Intervention” Science 319, 916-919.

2010    Wiley; died in a car crash

2011	 Culyba, E.K.; Price, J.L.; Hanson, S.R.; Dhar, A,; Wong, C-H.; Gruebele, M.; Powers, E.T.; Kelly, J.W. “Protein Native State Stabilization by Placing Aromatic Side Chains in N-Glycosylated Reverse Turns” Science 331, 571-575.

2012 Bulawa, C.E.; Connelly, S.; DeVit, M.; Wang, L. Weigel, C.;Fleming, J. Packman, J.; Powers, E.T.; Wiseman, R.L.; Foss, T.R.; Wilson, I.A.; Kelly, J.W.; Labaudiniere, R. “Tafamidis, A Potent and Selective Transthyretin Kinetic Stabilizer That Inhibits the Amyloid Cascade” Proc. Natl. Acad. Sci. 109, 9629-9634.

2013 Chen, W; Enck, S.; Price, J.L.; Powers, D.L.; Powers, E.T.; Wong, C-H.; Dyson, H.J.; Kelly, J.W. “The Structural and Energetic Basis of Protein-Carbohydrate Interactions” J. Am. Chem. Soc. 135, 9877-9884.

References

Living people
21st-century American chemists
Scripps Research faculty
1960 births
People from Medina, New York
Scientists from New York (state)